Mateo Chiarino is a Uruguayan actor, writer, and director of film, stage, and television. He is currently based in Buenos Aires, Argentina.

Early life 
Chiarino was born in Montevideo, Uruguay. He began his formal acting studies in Montevideo at the Escuela Multidisciplinaria de Arte Dramático (EMAD) (formerly, Escuela Municipal de Arte Dramático) completed in 2005 and the Escuela de Cine del Uruguay (Film School of Uruguay) completed in 2006.

Career 
Chiarino started his artistic career as a stage actor in his home country, Uruguay. He made his film acting debut in the drama Masángeles (2008). Subsequently, he was cast in various Spanish speaking films such as Cinco (2010), La culpa del cordero (2012), La máquina que escupe monstruos y la chica de mis sueños (2012), and Thesis on a Homicide (2013). Chiarino is known for his lead role in the Hawaii (2013) film in which he gained international attention from viewers.

In 2017, Chiarino made his directorial debut as theatre director for the Uz, el pueblo stage play production. His theatrical solo performance for the 2019's Nüremberg stage play garnered a nomination from Argentina's Asociación de Cronistas del Espectáculo (ACE) Awards for his excellent critical portrayal of a young skinhead. Chiarino currently resides in Buenos Aires, Argentina and is involved in various theatrical productions in his home town. Additionally, he teaches screenwriting via workshops.

Filmography

Films

Television

Theatre

Accolades

References

External links

Alternativa Teatral: Mateo Chiarino-Actor
Alejandro Vannelli: Mateo Chiarino
radiolexa: "EL SUBE Y BAJA con Mateo Chiarino"
Grandes de la Escena Nacional: "Nueva Generación: MATEO CHIARINO"

Living people
1983 births
People from Montevideo
Male actors from Montevideo
21st-century Uruguayan male actors
Uruguayan actors
Uruguayan male actors
Uruguayan film actors
Uruguayan male film actors
Uruguayan male stage actors
Uruguayan male television actors
Uruguayan film directors
Uruguayan theatre directors
Uruguayan screenwriters
Argentine people of Uruguayan descent